In software engineering and mathematics, numerical error is the error in the numerical computations.

Types
It can be the combined effect of two kinds of error in a calculation.
 the first is caused by the finite precision of computations involving floating-point or integer values
 the second usually called truncation error is the difference between the exact mathematical solution and the approximate solution obtained when simplifications are made to the mathematical equations to make them more amenable to calculation.  The term truncation comes from the fact that either these simplifications usually involve the truncation of an infinite series expansion so as to make the computation possible and practical, or because the least significant bits of an arithmetic operation are thrown away.

Measure
Floating-point numerical error is often measured in ULP (unit in the last place).

See also
 Loss of significance
 Numerical analysis
 Error analysis (mathematics)
 Round-off error
 Kahan summation algorithm
 Numerical sign problem

References

 Accuracy and Stability of Numerical Algorithms, Nicholas J. Higham, 
 "Computational Error And Complexity In Science And Engineering", V. Lakshmikantham, S.K. Sen,  

Computer arithmetic
Numerical analysis